Agriculture in Nova Scotia is the production of various food, feed, or fiber commodities to fulfill domestic and international human and animal sustenance needs. Nova Scotia is a province in Atlantic Canada totaling 55 284 km2 of land and water bordering New Brunswick. This province houses approximately 3795 farms averaging 262 acres per farm. The total land area used for farm lands in Nova Scotia is 995,943 acres.

There is a large range of crops and animals raised in the province and it is a large part of the economy in Nova Scotia. The Department of Agriculture is responsible for the overview of the agricultural practices in Nova Scotia.

History 
The name Nova Scotia originates from the Latin for New Scotland this reflects the history of the early settlers. Historically much of Nova Scotia was covered with forest, much of this has been reduced by the actions of the settlers. 

The first peoples of Nova Scotia, the Mi'kmaq, lived as hunters and traders. The Norse adventurers discovered Nova Scotian coasts but it was the Europeans that reached the first agricultural settlement.

In the early 19th century much was developed in Nova Scotia including the fishing and tree cutting businesses. Since 1950 there has been a financial struggle, the fishing industry (lobster and shellfish) has helped maintain Nova Scotia.

Major agricultural products

Crops 
Some of the major crops include grains, forages, carrots, broccoli, apples, grapes, blueberries as well as many other fruits and vegetables.

Blueberries are a particularly important crop for Nova Scotia. The lowbush blueberry is endemic to Eastern North America and is well adapted to the acidic soils found in Nova Scotia. Lowbush blueberries are typically cultivated on abandoned farmland or other land that is seen as unproductive. There are over 1,000 producers and over 40,000 acres devoted to blueberry production, which makes the blueberry the largest fruit crop in Nova Scotia.

Grape production in Nova Scotia is a growing industry that is attempting to increase production. The government of Nova Scotia spent $1 million in 2015 with the goal of doubling grape production by 2020. There are currently 632 acres land in grape production. Nova Scotian growers employ a wide range of grape cultivars in order to create a wines such as L'Acadie Blanc, Castel, Cayuga, Ortega. Many of these cultivars are French hybrid varieties suitable to the cooler climate in Nova Scotia.

Horticulture 
Wild flowers such as mayflower, pitcher plant, white water lily and a variety of violets grow throughout Nova Scotia. The Horticulture Nova Scotia (HNS) is a group that help educate people about horticulture in Nova Scotia involving the production, marketing, communication, and business management.

Forestry 
The original forests of Nova Scotia took many years for the settlers to clear in order to perform other forms of agriculture on the land.

Hardwood and coniferous trees are grown throughout Nova Scotia. Nova Scotia has over 4 million ha of forest, which has always been an important part of the provincial economy. Common soft woods include Eastern white pine, spruce, and balsam fir, as well as hardwoods such as red maple, sugar maple and yellow birch.

Nova Scotia also has a well established maple syrup production. The heavy snowfall in 2015 caused damage to farmers trees. In January 2016 $950,000 was invested by Nova Scotia's Agriculture Department to help farmers re-establish their sap collection systems.

Poultry and eggs 
Nova Scotia has the largest poultry production in Atlantic Canada with approximately 43 million kg of chicken, and 4.5 million kg of turkey in 2005. Poultry production is governed by supply management, guaranteeing a reliable and affordable supply of product to consumers. There are approximately 84 chicken growers in the province who produce approximately 43 million kg of meat and 17,493,000 dozen eggs annually.

Dairy 
Dairy is one of the largest agricultural industries in Nova Scotia. There are 203 farms that are part of the Dairy Farmers of Nova Scotia, the governing body that administers supply management system and sets the price of milk. The production exceeds 206 million litres of milk annually representing approximately $165 million of  farmgate revenue per year and providing over 600 jobs. A majority of this milk is processed at one of the 6 dairy processing plants, or 2 producer/processors in Nova Scotia. The remainder being processed out-of-province. There are two main types of dairy systems in Nova Scotia; pasture-based and confinement-based. Industry trends are pushing Nova Scotian dairy farms toward fewer, larger, confinement-based systems.

Livestock 
Livestock production in Nova Scotia consists of beef (108, 500), sheep (25,000), goat (2,000), Pigs (95,000), and Mink (984,000). These livestock are used for different yields such as milk, wool, meat and furs.

Global trends of livestock operation consolidation have been hard on Nova Scotian producers. Once considered a world renowned grass fed beef region, Nova Scotian beef producers are at a competitive disadvantage to Midwestern grain producing regions that can export carcasses cheaper than Nova Scotians can import grain. 
Similarly, the pig industry has been greatly diminished in Nova Scotia and relies heavily on subsidy.

Aquaculture 
The aquaculture industry in Canada is small but growing, with Canada's extensive coastline providing many opportunities for expansion of the aquaculture industry. Nova Scotia aims to provide an economically, environmentally, and socially sustainable aquaculture industry which creates year-round jobs and increased wealth throughout rural coastal Nova Scotia, while mitigating overfishing impacts, and allowing wild stocks to replenish. 

The combination of increased global demand for animal protein and innovation in aquaculture production systems have resulted in rapid expansion of the sector, with production value in Nova Scotia reaching $88,608,000 by 2018.  There are many finfish and shellfish species farmed between Nova Scotia's 200+ issued aquaculture leases. These include blue mussel, American oyster, rainbow trout, and Atlantic salmon.

Organic Farms 
There are approximately 359 farms involved in organic production in Nova Scotia. the majority of these farms are not certified for organic products, 17% are certified, 3.9% are transitioning to certification and 81.9% were not. The majority of the organic crops produce in Nova Scotia are fruits, vegetables, and various greenhouse products.

Economy 
The government of Canada has several programs to help the farmers with their costs of production. Many of these programs are contributed to by the farmers themselves as a sort of insurance plan.

The government started a new program that will qualify farmers for a tax credit who donate their spare food to the local food banks, this program will be available starting January 1, 2017. The government is also helping tree fruit crop growers due to the losses from a fire blight outbreak, they are providing 2.69 million dollars to help bring this under control and minimize damages.

The blueberry industry is always a strong force in the economy of Nova Scotia bringing in 70 million dollars in worldwide exports.

The field of aquaculture also has a great influence on the economy, bringing in over 1.68 billion to the province. This looks to increase with the increasing demand and improvement in practices as well as new innovation in farmed fisheries.

Agritourism is a new opportunity to grow the economy, this is a great way to increase the sustainability within the farming system. These can include farm markets, wineries, u-picks, and farm based festivals. This can be great for Nova Scotia's economy because the province has very rich farming history and culture. Although other barriers do exist such as product development, government support, marketing, education and training.

Other

Water 
There are over 3000 lakes as well as many rivers and streams throughout Nova Scotia. The water in Nova Scotia has also been very important to the forestry sector throughout its history. The provincial government of Nova Scotia has helped with the land use planning in many areas such as the Annapolis Valley in an attempt to reduce the groundwater issues and drinking water contamination. Local governments have also sought to re-mediate these issues by working with the community to understand what needs to be done. The education of the land owners is most important when trying to protect the water sources.

Soil 
There are many areas throughout Nova Scotia that have very fertile soil such as the Annapolis valley and Cornwallis Valley. The soils in Nova Scotia are mostly acidic. 29% of land is suitable for agriculture. The best land is in the lowlands were the soil has had the opportunity to develop into deeper soils. The soils in the uplands tend to be shallower and more rocky thus less fertile.

These fertile lands in the marshlands consist of fertile alluvial flood plains and river valleys. these land are easily cultivable land thus they were used a lot by the settlers.

Topography 
The land Nova Scotia varies from coast to coast with rugged coastlines, inlets, islands, coves and bays to large lowlands connecting the various parts of the landscape. In these lowlands there are various valleys that have been formed during the Triassic period. Areas such as the Bay of Fundy are now very important to the field of agriculture because of the marshlands formed by the high tides, once dykes were built these lands could be harnessed for crops. These dykes were built by the French Settlers in order to secure the salt they needed for curing the fish, this land was later used for agriculture, and these structures have since been built and kept by the Department of Agriculture.

References 

 
Economy of Nova Scotia